Adapter or adaptor may refer to:

Adapter a device used to match the physical or electrical characteristics of two different objects
AC adapter, an electric power supply device
Adapter (genetics), a small DNA molecule used in genetic engineering
Adapter (rocketry), a segment between rocket stages
Adapter (computing), used to connect various hardware devices
Adapter (piping), a short length of pipe with two different ends
Adapter pattern, a software design pattern used for computer programming
Signal transducing adaptor protein, a type of protein involved in cell signalling
Blank-firing adaptor, a device which enables automatic firearms to fire blanks
Diving cylinder adapter, a diving accessory for interfacing different equipment
Adapter, a type of hand movement in nonverbal communication

See also 
 Gender of connectors and fasteners, relevant to adapters with male and female connections
 Coupling, a mechanical connection between two objects
 Electrical connector, often the subject of an electrical adapter